Jimmy Hamilton (1917–1994) was an American jazz clarinetist, tenor saxophonist, arranger, composer, and music educator.

Jimmy Hamilton may refer to:

 Jimmy Hamilton (footballer, born 1904) (1904–?), English football half-back and manager
 Jimmy Hamilton (footballer, born 1906) Scottish footballer, played for Girvan Juniors, Hamilton Academical, Ayr Utd, Rochdale, Wrexham, Carlisle Utd and Chester between 1926 and 1940
 Jimmy Hamilton (footballer, born 1955), Scottish football midfielder
 Jimmy Hamilton (curler), Scottish curler

See also
 Jamie Hamilton (disambiguation)
 Jim Hamilton (disambiguation)
 James Hamilton (disambiguation)